State Library railway station (originally under the working title of CBD North) is a railway station currently under construction as part of the Metro Tunnel project in Melbourne, Victoria. Construction commenced in 2018 with the station scheduled to open in 2025.

History 
In December 2008, the proposal for a new underground rail corridor running north-south through the Melbourne CBD was incorporated into the Brumby Ministry's Victorian Transport Plan after originally featuring in a report from Rod Eddington. It was to be built in two stages: the first from Footscray to St Kilda Road, and the second continuing to Caulfield. The need for a new rail corridor and stations through the CBD was identified in an effort to reduce congestion on the City Loop, enabling more frequent and reliable services across Melbourne's railway network.

Following a change of State Government, in 2012/2013 the Baillieu and Napthine Ministries announced a revised plan with the tunnel instead running from South Kensington to South Yarra along a similar route to the original proposal. The revised project included five underground stations, including one under the working title 'CBD North' and was listed as the highest-priority infrastructure project in Melbourne by Infrastructure Australia.

The project went unfunded due largely to tension between the state and federal governments. In February 2015 the proposal was revived by the newly elected Andrews Ministry with construction to commence in 2018 and the tunnel and stations planned to open in 2026. The total cost of the project is A$11 billion.

Naming 
In August 2017, the Government launched a naming competition for the five new railway stations to be constructed as part of the Metro Rail Project. Following over 50,000 submissions, in November 2017 State Library was announced as the winning entry for the working-title CBD North station due to its proximity to the landmark State Library of Victoria building.

Location 
The railway station is located below Swanston Street between La Trobe and Streets in the northern edges of Melbourne's CBD. The station will connect with Melbourne Central station via a pedestrian walkway, enabling transfer from other railway lines and will have entrances at the corner of Latrobe/Swanston Street and Franklin/Swanston Street, enabling more convenient access to City Baths and Queen Victoria Market.

The initial build method chosen for construction was cut-and-cover, however this was changed in order to avoid significant disruption and to keep trams running along the world's busiest tram corridor, Swanston Street.

Services from 2025  

Platform 1:
 All stations and limited express services to Sunbury

Platform 2:
 Express services to Pakenham and Cranbourne

References

Buildings and structures in Melbourne City Centre
Proposed railway stations in Melbourne
Railway stations scheduled to open in 2025
Railway stations located underground in Melbourne
Railway stations in the City of Melbourne (LGA)